Tsinilla unciphrona is a species of moth of the family Tortricidae. It is found in Colombia.

The wingspan is about 20 mm. The ground colour of the forewings is pale pinkish white, preserved as subapical interfascia limited anteriorly by leaden-grey fascia. The apical third of the costa is orange ferruginous with white costal strigulae (fine streaks). The remaining area is brown with dark brown spots medially. The hindwings are dark brown.

Etymology
The species name refers to the presence of the uncus and is derived from Greek  (meaning 'I carry').

References

	

Moths described in 2011
Olethreutini
Taxa named by Józef Razowski